Louis Rohan Tillett (born 1959) is an Australian rock music singer-songwriter, keyboardist and saxophonist. Tillett was the front man in Australian bands The Wet Taxis, Paris Green and The Aspersion Caste. He has also worked as a backing musician with Catfish, Laughing Clowns, New Christs and Tex Perkins. For Tillett's solo career he has issued seven albums, Ego Tripping at the Gates of Hell (1987), A Cast of Aspersions (1990), Letters to a Dream (1992), Cry Against the Faith (1998), Learning to Die (2001), The Hanged Man (2005) and Soliloquy (2006). He has often worked with Charlie Owen, releasing two albums, The Ugly Truth (1994) and Midnight Rain (October 1995). The latter album won the Rolling Stone Critics Award for Best Album of 1996.

Biography
Louis Rohan Tillett was born in 1959 and grew up in Sydney. In 1977 his first band, The Wet Taxis, began as a group "based around experiments with 'industrial noise'". In 1980 they issued a cassette, Taxidermy, on the Terse Tapes label – owned by fellow Sydney band, Severed Heads. For the album Tillett provided synthesiser (micromoog) and The Wet Taxis line up was Garry Bradbury on drum machine, Simon Knuckey on guitar, and his brother Tim Knuckey on bass guitar. In October that year Terse Tapes released an extended play, Terse Sample, by Various Artists with tracks by Wet Taxis and label mates: Mindless Delta Children, Agent Orange and Rhoborhythmaticons.

By 1981, with Tillett on piano and lead vocals, the group were moving into a "tougher 1960s-influenced direction". In 1982 Bradbury left to join Severed Heads and was replaced by Nick Fisher on drums. Peter Watt also joined on rhythm guitar but was replaced in the next year by Penny Ikinger. In February 1984 The Wet Taxis first toured Melbourne, they were hailed as sporting an American garage-style psychedelic sound, they covered bands such as MC5, Moving Sidewalks and Unrelated Segments. In Melbourne they supported Kids in the Kitchen at one gig and Chris Bailey at another. They followed with a live broadcast from the Prince of Wales Hotel, St.Kilda, on 3PBS FM radio.

The group signed with the Hot Records label and recorded a single, "C'mon", which was a cover version of The Atlantics 1967 track, "Come On". It was produced by David Connor and Kent Steedman, and was released in May 1984. Australian musicologist, Ian McFarlane, noted it provided "an authentic 1960s garage/R&B sound". Late that year they issued an album, From the Archives, and by February 1985 went into hiatus. In July 1986 Pollyanna Sutton of The Canberra Times described the album as "a mix of studio and live recordings over three years". In 2002 the band, alongside Laughing Clowns, The Lighthouse Keepers and Gondwanaland Project, were described by The Sydney Morning Heralds Matt Buchanan as one "of the most popular bands in the Australia's indie scene" in an article reminiscing about Hot Records.

Back in late 1983, Tillett worked with Damien Lovelock of The Celibate Rifles and Brett Myers of Died Pretty in a side project, No Dance. The trio issued a three-track EP, Carnival of Souls, in March 1984; which featured lead vocals by each member: Tillett's "Swimming in the Mirror", Lovelock's "You Say", and Myers' "Just Skin". McFarlane described No Dance's style, "[they] eschewed the electric rock framework of the musicians' respective bands for a more acoustic and melodic approach". In mid-year Tillett provided piano for Laughing Clowns' album, Ghosts of an Ideal Wife (August 1985).

By late 1984 Tillett was working with another side project, Paris Green, with a core of himself, Raoul Hawkins on bass guitar, and Jeffrey Wegener on drums (ex-Laughing Clowns) joined by "a loose aggregation of musicians". Other musicians included Louis Burdett on drums (ex-Benders) and Charlie Owen on lead guitar (ex-Tango Bravo). According to McFarlane Paris Green "covered material ranging from Mose Allison to John Coltrane, Ray Charles to Nina Simone, and on any given night there was as many as nine or ten musicians on stage". Tillet (on piano) and Fisher worked on Ed Kuepper's debut solo album, Electrical Storm (June 1985).

In January 1986 Tillett, Fisher and Ikinger revived The Wet Taxis with Rod Howard on bass guitar, Jason Kain on lead guitar (ex-Relatives), and Bronstantine Karlarka on keyboards. By May they were joined by a brass section of Dianne Spence on saxophone, Kathy Wemyss on trumpet (both ex-Laughing Clowns), and Gladys Reed on trombone. Reed had backed No Dance on Carnival of Souls. In July Tillett described his three newest members to Sutton, "[t]here are so many hot female musicians in Sydney and none seem to be getting a go. It is not just a gimmick". The Wet Taxis supported a tour by Nico and undertook other tours. They issued a single, "Sailor's Dream" in May 1987, which was produced by Rob Younger (of Radio Birdman, New Christs) at Paradise Studios for Citadel Records. The band broke up by mid-year.

Tillett recorded his debut solo album, Ego Tripping at the Gates of Hell, with bandmates Ikinger and Spence; Burdett and Owen (both now ex-New Christs); and with Lenny Bastiaans on bass guitar. Tillett co-produced with Bruce Callaway, it was issued on Citadel Records during November 1987. McFarlane felt its style was a mix of "jazz, blues, R&B, pop and rock, making for fascinating and engrossing listening". Tillett told Stuart Coupe of The Canberra Times his motivation, "[it] was to play songs within a wide spectrum, everything from a full band through to a duet. It gets away from the expectations that people have with me of it always sounding like Wet Taxis". To promote his album, Tillett assembled a backing band, The Ego Trippers from Hell, and toured Australia.

In 1989 Tillett briefly joined Catfish, Don Walker's side-project, on vocals. Also in that year Tillett fronted The Aspersion Caste, aka Louis Tillett and His Cast of Aspersions, with Bastiaans, Burdett, Ikinger (by then ex-Kings of the World) and Owen; they were joined by Miroslav Bukovsky on trumpet, James Greening on trombone, and Jason Morphett on saxophone. The group released a single, "Condemned to Live", in January 1990 on the Blue Mosque label, which was distributed by Festival Records. McFarlane felt it displayed "astonishing gut-bucket blues that packed a considerable punch". In 1989, Tillett also contributed piano to the debut single from Sydney band Bughouse.

In April 1990 the parent album, A Cast of Aspersions, followed on Blue Mosque/Festival Records which was co-produced by Tillett and Owen. It was "another eclectic set of material driven by Tillett's booming baritone voice and smouldering organ, Owen's jagged guitar lines and the swinging brass arrangements" according to McFarlane. The Canberra Times Penelope Layland was "let down by the lyrics" while his "musicianship is impeccable, his melding of jazz and rock is imaginative and perfectly executed", however "[c]annibals and witches populate Tillett's songs, and these characters indulge in an array of unspeakable pagan rites ... the lyrics seem to be aimed at kids at a slumber party, trying to outscare each other with horror stories". Tillett and The Aspersion Caste toured Australian and then Europe.

By 1991 The Aspersion Caste line-up was Fisher and Spence with Jackie Orszaczky on bass guitar (ex-Syrius) and Colin Watson on guitar. Orszaczky was soon replaced by Damian Kennedy on bass guitar. The backing group were disbanded in the next year as Tillett worked on his solo album, Letters to a Dream (October 1992), which he co-produced with Barry Wolfison. Bevan Hannan writing for The Canberra Times finds "[t]he instrumentals are infatuating, perhaps long-winded at times, but to Tillett's credit he sustains the mood, mainly due to the absence of electronics and a rhythm section. His bold operatic voice is engaging and he works an interesting interplay with backing singer Mary-Ellen Stringer".

In June 1993 Tillett (on piano, Hammond organ, vocals and percussion) and Owen (on guitar and percussion) recorded an album, The Ugly Truth, with Owen producing. It was released in 1994 on Return to Sender/Normal Records. The pair released a second album together, Midnight Rain, in October 1995, which was produced by Tony Cohen. For that album Tillett provided lead vocals, piano, Hammond organ, Roland synthesiser and soprano saxophone. The pair toured in support of the album. Midnight Rain won the Rolling Stone Critics Award for Best Album of 1996. Later that year Tillett and Owen joined Tex Perkins' backing band on a promotional tour for the latter's debut solo album, Far Be It from Me (August 1996).

Discography

Albums

References

General
  Note: Archived [on-line] copy has limited functionality.
Specific

External links
Official site

Living people
Australian rock singers
Australian singer-songwriters
Australian rock keyboardists
Musicians from Sydney
1959 births
Timberyard Records artists